Strawberry Shortcake: Berry Blossom Festival is a direct-to-DVD feature that was released on May 1, 2007 by 20th Century Fox Home Entertainment, although it was given an early release by Kidtoon Films on March 13 in select Cinemas. Every copy of the DVD comes with a Berry Blossom Festival Crown, as seen in the film.

Synopsis
Like with the other DVDs of Strawberry Shortcake, Berry Blossom Festival uses a "Compilation" format where Strawberry recalls the featured episodes in her "Remembering Book". The episodes featured on this DVD are "Mind Your Manners" and "Queen For a Day".

Mind Your Manners
Strawberry Shortcake's friend, Raspberry Torte, shows absolutely no regards towards manners. So Strawberry and Company decides to teach her a lesson by first inviting her to a party where everyone shows disregard for manners, and another where everyone is polite and courteous. Eventually, she understands how important good manners are.

Queen for a Day
Through trickery and cheating, the Purple Pieman snatches the Berry Blossom crown from Strawberry.

Release
Berry Blossom Festival was released as part of Kidtoon Films' monthly program, during weekend matinees in select venues. The feature was only shown digitally, and not printed on traditional 35mm stock; had no major press reviews during its stay in theaters; and was designated as a direct-to-DVD feature in the first place. Hence, as with all of Kidtoon's past movies, it is not considered a legitimate theatrical release, according to animation expert Jerry Beck on his Cartoon Research site.

References

External links
 Official site (also provides brief story details)
 

2007 films
2007 animated films
Strawberry Shortcake films
Television series by DIC Entertainment
2000s American animated films
DIC Entertainment films
20th Century Fox direct-to-video films
20th Century Fox animated films
2000s English-language films
2000s French films